"Tryin' to Hide a Fire in the Dark" is a song co-written and recorded by American country music artist Billy Dean. It was released in November 1992 as the first single from Dean's album Fire in the Dark. The song reached No. 6 on the Billboard Hot Country Singles & Tracks chart in March 1993 and No. 1 on the RPM Country Tracks chart in Canada. It was written by Dean and Tim Nichols.

Music video
The music video was directed by Bill Young and premiered in late 1992.

Chart performance

Year-end charts

References

1992 singles
Billy Dean songs
Songs written by Tim Nichols
Song recordings produced by Jimmy Bowen
Liberty Records singles
Songs written by Billy Dean
1992 songs